Menecina is a monotypic moth genus of the family Erebidae. Its only species, Menecina bifacies, is found in Brazil. Both the genus and the species were first described by Francis Walker in 1858.

References

Calpinae
Monotypic moth genera